John Churchill Sibley was born on 12 December 1858 in Crewkerne, Somerset and became a boarder at the local School, where, from the age of 13 he played the school organ.

At 18 Sibley became a teacher at Clifton Grammar School in Warwickshire, where he was also the organist. To avoid making a noise, he practiced on a small harmonium. without using the bellows and eventually gained his Doctor of Music degree in 1894.

Director of Music

Later he was appointed to the position of Director of the Queen's Music and became well known as a composer of both sacred and secular music. He continued to work both as a conductor and composer but after the First World War began to take a greater interest in spiritual matters and a common bond through music led to him accepting ordination as a priest from F.E.J. Lloyd in 1924.

Archbishop

When he retired in 1929, he determined to devote his declining years to the service of God, and after his consecration by Lloyd in 1929, returned to England as Archbishop Metropolitan of the Orthodox Catholic Church in the British Empire.
 
Unfortunately in this new role he rapidly attracted enemies in the established Church who often employed agent provocateurs and the gutter press against him. Despite this persecution he was always the perfect gentleman, and there was a firm chin under his George V beard.

Persecutions

Yet he was often deceived by people who appealed to his kindly nature and both he and his wife suffered greatly from treachery by those they sought to help. Eventually he was to admit, ‘One can be too easily accessible.’ One such attack came from a young woman reporter from the gutter press, who first sought his help and then launched a vicious attack through “John Bull” a gutter press magazine. The same woman later tried a similar trick with the Rev. Father, John Ward, but warned by the Archbishop, he was less easily duped.
 
In his ecclesiastical capacity Sibley wore a black suit, black spats, purple stock, and a wide-brimmed hat with a rosette.  He was a likeable old man with steady blue eyes behind his gold-rimmed glasses, very upright in stance and courteous in the extreme, yet underneath was a will of iron. Sibley himself suffered great pain from an enlarged prostate, and many persecutions but struggled on.

A Religious Community

Wishing to establish a religious community he sought to purchase Minster Abbey on the Isle of Thanet in the River Thames, where once St Sexburga had been in charge, but he was attacked so vehemently in John Bull that the whole scheme fell through. Nevertheless, it was through this contact that some of the bones of St Sexburga came into the possession of John Ward and the Abbey of Christ the King. They are still preserved at St Michael's in Caboolture.
 
Sibley also established an Intercollegiate University, which offered degrees to clergymen from various denominations after appropriate studies. Lloyd had already set up a similar facility in America, supported by his wealthy wife, but Sibley had no such financial backer and eventually the British university, which never made a profit, died out. Eventually through his meeting with the Ward and the subsequent admission of the Confraternity to the Orthodox Catholic Church, Sibley found some success even in this life, but the pressure of constant persecution told on his wife, who predeceased him.

Death and Beatification

Just after his 80th birthday, on 15 December 1938 John Churchill Sibley went to his well earned rest, and was buried in High Barnet cemetery during a raging snowstorm in a funeral arranged by John Ward and the Community. Soon afterwards, the Archbishop John Churchill Sibley was recognised as having been raised to the ranks of the Blessed Saints of God.

External links
  The John Sebastian Marlow Ward Website

1858 births
1938 deaths
20th-century English clergy
English composers
Metropolitan bishops
People from Crewkerne